During the 1977–78 English football season, Brentford competed in the Football League Fourth Division. 58 goals from Steve Phillips and Andrew McCulloch helped the club to a 4th-place finish and promotion to the Third Division. Phillips' 36 goals was the most in English league football by any player during the season.

Season summary 
Having spent much of the previous season rebuilding the unbalanced squad left by his predecessor John Docherty, Brentford manager Bill Dodgin Jr. shrugged off two off-season disappointments (failing to agree a fee with Bristol City for John Bain and Terry Johnson's refusal to sign a new contract) by bringing in goalkeeper Len Bond for £8,000 and midfielders Barry Lloyd and Willie Graham. Expectations were high going into the 1977–78 Fourth Division season, with Dodgin's attractive brand of attacking football having led to 14 wins from the final 18 matches of the previous season.

After a what was then becoming traditional first round exit of the League Cup, Brentford had a strong start to the league season, going top on 22 August 1977 after a 4–1 victory over Fourth Division newcomers Wimbledon. The three-pronged attack of forwards Gordon Sweetzer, Andrew McCulloch and midfielder Steve Phillips proved fruitful after 10 league matches and Phillips and Sweetzer topped the Fourth Division goalscoring chart with eight apiece. Injuries to Gordon Sweetzer, Dave Carlton, John Fraser, captain Jackie Graham and a suspension suffered by Andrew McCulloch nullified Brentford's threat through the Christmas period and the club dropped back into the upper reaches of mid-table.

By mid-January 1978, Brentford began to recover and the £10,000 signing of full back Barry Tucker would prove to be the final piece of the jigsaw in manager Bill Dodgin Jr.'s starting XI. A 4–0 win over Rochdale at Griffin Park on 6 March put the Bees back on the cusp of the promotion places for the first time since mid-December, but the shock transfer of forward Gordon Sweetzer to Cambridge United two days later for a £30,000 fee was seen as a massive risk. Sweetzer had scored 40 goals from his 72 appearances for the club over 18 months, but manager Dodgin felt that with Steve Phillips having scored 16 goals from midfield so far in the season, Phillips could move up to the forward line to partner Andrew McCulloch. In addition, Phillips was allowed to play a free role in matches, roaming between midfield, the wings and the forward line. Dodgin's decision proved to be a masterstroke, with Phillips scoring 16 goals in the final 15 matches of the season and promotion to the Third Division was secured with two matches still to play.

Phillips' 36 goals meant that he finished the season as the top scorer in English league football, while Andrew McCulloch and the departed Gordon Sweetzer supported ably with 22 and 14 goals respectively. The 58 goals Phillips' and McCulloch's strike partnership yielded equated to just under 63% of the club's total scored in league matches.

One club record was equalled during the season:
 Highest away Football League aggregate score: 10 (6–4 versus Crewe Alexandra, 3 September 1977)

League table

Results
Brentford's goal tally listed first.

Legend

Pre-season and friendlies

Football League Fourth Division

FA Cup

Football League Cup 

 Sources: 100 Years of Brentford, The Big Brentford Book of the Seventies,Croxford, Lane & Waterman, p. 312. Statto

Playing squad 
Players' ages are as of the opening day of the 1977–78 season.

 Sources: The Big Brentford Book of the Seventies, Timeless Bees

Coaching staff

Statistics

Appearances and goals
Substitute appearances in brackets.

Players listed in italics left the club mid-season.
Source: 100 Years of Brentford

Goalscorers 

Players listed in italics left the club mid-season.
Source: 100 Years of Brentford

Management

Summary

Transfers & loans

Awards 
 Supporters' Player of the Year: Andrew McCulloch
 Players' Player of the Year: Andrew McCulloch
 Adidas Golden Boot: Steve Phillips
 Evening Standard Player of the Month: Steve Phillips (March 1978)
 Football League Fourth Division Manager of the Month: Bill Dodgin Jr. (March 1978)

References 

Brentford F.C. seasons
Brentford